Nacella is a southern, cold-water genus of true limpets, marine gastropod molluscs in the family Nacellidae, the true limpets.

These limpets are found in the littoral zone and sublittoral zone of Antarctic and sub-Antarctic waters including (Tierra del Fuego, Macquarie Island, Kerguelen Island, and Heard and McDonald Islands). The grayish-brown shell is suboval and flattened and the ribbing on the shell is rather flat. The shiny interior of the shell is rust-colored or chocolate-brown.

Species 
Species within the genus Nacella include:
 Nacella clypeater  R. P. Lesson, 1831  - Chilean copper limpet
 Nacella concinna  Strebel, 1908 
 Nacella deaurata  J. F. Gmelin, 1791  - Patagonian copper limpet
 Nacella delesserti  Philippi, 1849 
 Nacella edgari  Powell, 1957 
 Nacella flammea  Gmelin, 1791  
 Nacella kerguelenensis (E. A. Smith, 1877)
 Nacella macquariensis Finlay, 1927
 Nacella magellanica  J. F. Gmelin, 1791  - Magellanic copper limpet
 Nacella mytilina  Helbling, 1779  
 Nacella terroris (Filhol, 1880) 
 Nacella yaghana sp. nov. González-Wevar & Nakano, 2019

 Species brought into synonymy
 † Nacella baylei Cossmann, 1882: synonym of  † Acroreia baylei (Cossmann, 1882) (new combination)
 Nacella cernica H. Adams, 1869: synonym of Cellana livescens (Reeve, 1855)
 Nacella chiloensis (Reeve, 1855): synonym of Nacella magellanica (Gmelin, 1791)
 Nacella compressa Verco, 1906: synonym of Naccula compressa (Verco, 1906)
 Nacella compressa Mabille & Rochebrune, 1889: synonym of Nacella mytilina (Helbling, 1779)
 Nacella crebristriata Verco, 1904: synonym of Asteracmea crebristriata (Verco, 1904)
 Nacella delicatissima Strebel, 1907: represents particular morphotypes of Nacella deaurata (Gmelin, 1791)
 Nacella falklandica Preston, 1913: synonym of Nacella mytilina (Helbling, 1779)
 Nacella flexuosa Hutton, 1873: synonym of Cellana radians (Gmelin, 1791)
 Nacella fuegiensis  L. A. Reeve, 1855   - Tierra del Fuego limpet: synonym of Nacella deaurata (Gmelin, 1791)
 Nacella mytiloides Schumacher, 1817: synonym of Nacella mytilina (Helbling, 1779)
 Nacella parva Angas, 1876: synonym of Naccula parva (Angas, 1876)
 Nacella peltoides Carpenter, 1864: synonym of Williamia peltoides (Carpenter, 1864)
 Nacella polaris (Hombron & Jacquinot, 1841): synonym of Nacella concinna (Strebel, 1908)
 Nacella stowae Verco, 1906: synonym of Asteracmea stowae (Verco, 1906)
 Nacella strigatella Rochebrune & Mabille, 1885: synonym of Nacella deaurata (Gmelin, 1791)
 Nacella subspiralis Carpenter, 1864: synonym of Williamia subspiralis (Carpenter, 1864)
 Nacella tasmanica Tate & May, 1900: synonym of Propilidium tasmanicum (Pilsbry, 1895) (junior synonym)
 Nacella venosa (Reeve, 1855): synonym of Nacella magellanica (Gmelin, 1791)

References

 Powell A. W. B., New Zealand Mollusca, William Collins Publishers Ltd, Auckland, New Zealand 1979

External links
 Schumacher, C. F. (1817). Essai d'un nouveau système des habitations des vers testacés. Schultz, Copenghagen. iv + 288 pp., 22 pls
 González-Wevar C.A., Hüne M., Rosenfeld S., Nakano T., Saucède T., Spencer H. & Poulin E. (2018). Systematic revision of Nacella (Patellogastropoda: Nacellidae) based on a complete phylogeny of the genus, with the description of a new species from the southern tip of South America. Zoological Journal of the Linnean Society. DOI: 10.1093/zoolinnean/zly067
 New Zealand mollusca checklist

Nacellidae